The 2012 Rodrigues Regional Assembly election was held on 5 February. The Rodrigues People's Organisation won eleven seats and a majority, with the Rodrigues Movement winning eight seats and the Rodrigues Patriotic Front winning two.

Results

References

Politics of Rodrigues
Elections in Mauritius
Rodrigues
2012 in Mauritius
Rodrigues